The Estonian Air Force had more than 130 aircraft in the middle of the 1930s. Estonian engineers had previously designed and constructed several trainer and light fighter aircraft types, of which the most famous is the PTO-4 which entered service in 1938 as a military training aircraft.

Before the Soviet occupation, Estonia had placed an order for 12 Supermarine Spitfire fighters and 2 Westland Lysander aircraft from Britain, and was also seeking to purchase 12 Messerschmitt 109 fighters from Germany. Deliveries were interrupted by the start of World War II and the Spitfires later served in the Royal Air Force.

Aircraft

This is a list of aircraft formerly used by the Estonian Õhukaitse:

Reconnaissance aircraft
Halberstadt CL.IV: 4
Halberstadt C.V: 5
RAF BE2e: 2
Shchetinin M-16: 1
Farman HF.30: 1
DFW C.V: 4
AGO C.IV: 1
FBA Type H: 1
Friedrichshafen FF.41AT: 1
Letov Šmolík 228E: 4
Henschel Hs 126B-1: 5
Short 184: 6
Lebedev 12: 1

Trainer aircraft
Avro 504K: 12 
Avro 504R: 12 
Avro 594 Avian: 6 
Avro 626 Prefect: 4 
Avro Anson: 1
PN-3: 1
PTO-4: 6
Hanriot HD.14: 2
PON-1A: 4
Miles Magister: 1

Jet Trainer aircraft
Aero L-39 Albatros

Fighter aircraft
Sopwith Camel 2F1: 1
Nieuport 17: 2
Nieuport 21: 1
Nieuport 23: 1
Nieuport 24bis: 3
Gourdou-Leseurre GL-22: 15
Grigorovich M-11: 1
SPAD S.VII: 2
Bristol Bulldog Mk.II: 12
Siskin IIIDC: 2

Bomber aircraft
RAF RE8: 8
Potez 25 A.2: 9
Hawker Hart: 8
Airco DH.9: 13

Multi-role aircraft
Sopwith 1½ Strutter: 1

Flying Boat
Norman Thompson NT2B: 2

See also
 Military of Estonia
 List of active Estonian Air Force aircraft

Notes and references

 Gerdessen, Frederik "Estonian Air Power 1918 - 1945". Air Enthusiast No 18, April  - July 1982. Pages 61–76. ISSN 0143-5450.
 Humberstone, Richard. Estonian Air Force, 1918-1940 (Insignia Air Force Special No.3). London: Blue Rider Publishing, 1999. 
 Gerdessen, Frederik; Kitvel, Toivo and Tilk, Johannes. "Aeg, mehed, lennukid" Tallinn: Eesti Entsüklopeediakirjastus 2001
 Kitvel, Toivo and Tilk, Johannes ""Eesti lennukroonika: tekste ja pilte aastani 1940" Tallinn: Aviopol 2003

Military equipment of Estonia
Estonian Air Force